Maximiano Prieto Sánchez (28 March 1919 – 30 May 1998) was a Mexican professional footballer who played as a forward for Mexico at the 1950 FIFA World Cup. He also played for Guadalajara.

References

External links
FIFA profile

1919 births
1998 deaths
Mexico international footballers
Footballers from Guadalajara, Jalisco
Association football forwards
C.D. Guadalajara footballers
1950 FIFA World Cup players
Mexican footballers